The 2023 Delray Beach Open was a professional men's tennis tournament played on hard courts. It was the 31st edition of the tournament and part of the 2023 ATP Tour. It took place in Delray Beach, United States between February 13 and February 19, 2023.

Champions

Singles

  Taylor Fritz def.  Miomir Kecmanović, 6–0, 5–7, 6–2

Doubles

  Marcelo Arévalo /  Jean-Julien Rojer def.  Rinky Hijikata /  Reese Stalder, 6–3, 6–4

Point and prize money

Point distribution

Prize money 

*per team

Singles main-draw entrants

Seeds 

† Rankings are as of 6 February 2022.

Other entrants
The following players received wildcards into the main draw:
  Aleksandar Kovacevic
  Jack Sock
  Fernando Verdasco

The following players received entry as a special exempt:
 Wu Yibing

The following players received entry from the qualifying draw:
  Nuno Borges
  Christopher Eubanks 
  Matija Pecotić 
  Wu Tung-lin

The following players received entry as lucky losers:
  Steve Johnson
  Aleksandar Vukic

Withdrawals 
 Before the tournament
  Jenson Brooksby → replaced by  Denis Kudla
  John Isner → replaced by  Aleksandar Vukic
  Jiří Lehečka → replaced by  Emilio Gómez
  Reilly Opelka → replaced by  Radu Albot
  Wu Yibing → replaced by  Steve Johnson

Doubles main-draw entrants

Seeds 

 1 Rankings are as of 6 February 2023.

Other entrants 
The following pairs received wildcards into the main draw:
  Christian Harrison /  Denis Kudla 
  Brandon Holt /  Alex Lawson

Withdrawals 
  Jérémy Chardy /  Fabrice Martin → replaced by  Diego Hidalgo /  Hunter Reese
  Aisam-ul-Haq Qureshi /  Miguel Ángel Reyes-Varela → replaced by  Hans Hach Verdugo /  Miguel Ángel Reyes-Varela

References

External links 
Tournament overview on ATP Tour website
Official website

2023 ATP Tour
2023 in American tennis
February 2023 sports events in the United States
2023 in sports in Florida